Sir Alexander Charles Ramsay-Gibson-Maitland, 3rd baronet (7 January 1820 – 16 May 1876) was a Scottish Liberal politician who sat in the House of Commons from 1868 to 1874.

Early life
Ramsay-Gibson-Maitland was born Maitland-Gibson, the son of Alexander Maitland-Gibson of Clifton Hall, Midlothian. He was  educated at Edinburgh Academy and at Weimer College and became a lieutenant in the 79th Highlanders. He succeeded his grandfather, the 2nd baronet in the baronetcy in 1848. In 1866, he assumed the surname of Ramsay before that of Gibson, when he succeeded to the estates of Ramsay of Barnton.

Career
He was a Deputy Lieutenant and J.P. for Edinburgh and Stirlingshire, a colonel of the Stirlingshire Militia and captain in the Midlothian Yeomanry Cavalry.

At the 1868 general election, Ramsay-Gibson-Maitland was elected Member of Parliament for Midlothian. He held the seat until 1874.

Personal life
Ramsay-Gibson-Maitland married Thomasina Agnes Hunt, daughter of James Hunt of Pittencrieff in 1841.

Ramsay-Gibson-Maitland died at the age of 56. He is buried in the Grange Cemetery in Edinburgh against the north wall, towards the west entrance.

References

External links

1820 births
1876 deaths
Scottish Liberal Party MPs
Members of the Parliament of the United Kingdom for Scottish constituencies
UK MPs 1868–1874
Baronets in the Baronetage of the United Kingdom
Deputy Lieutenants of Edinburgh
Deputy Lieutenants of Stirlingshire
People educated at Edinburgh Academy